Blow is collaboration album between American rappers Messy Marv and Berner. The album includes guest appearances from B-Legit, Yukmouth and C-Bo. Blow peaked at #87 on the R&B/Hip-Hop Albums chart, #31 on the Heatseekers Albums chart, and #6 on the Top Heatseekers West North Central chart.

Track listing

References

2009 albums
Collaborative albums
Messy Marv albums
Albums produced by Cozmo
Albums produced by Maxwell Smart (record producer)
SMC Recordings albums